This is a list of the busiest airports in Poland.

At a glance

2022

2021

2020

2019

2018

2017

2016

Notes:

: Olsztyn-Mazury Airport commenced operation on 20 January 2016.

2015

Notes:

 : Radom Airport became operational on 29 May 2014. However, it didn't commence operation until 1 September 2015.

See also
 List of airports in Poland
 List of the busiest airports in Europe

References

 
Po